Herschel Savage (born Harvey Cohen on November 25, 1952) is an American former pornographic actor, director and stage actor who has appeared in over 1,000 adult films. In 2002, AVN ranked him 46th on their list of The Top 50 Porn Stars of All Time. He has also been inducted into the AVN and XRCO Halls of Fame.

Early life
Savage was born to Russian-Jewish parents on November 25, 1952 in New York City. His mother battled with obsessive-compulsive disorder. Growing up, he attended a Conservative synagogue. Savage saw his first adult film The Nun's Bad Habit at a movie theater in Times Square.

Savage began studying acting under Broadway theatre actress Uta Hagen and renowned acting teacher Stella Adler. Savage initially sought a mainstream stage and screen career. However, he became disillusioned by the constant auditioning and competition for roles. He also worked for an exercise company.

Career

Savage was introduced to the adult film industry via the actor R. Bolla in 1976, He went on to become one of the biggest stars of the "Golden Age of Porn" in the 1970s and 1980s. Savage appeared in the 1978 classic Debbie Does Dallas, for which he was paid about $150 a day. The film was a financial success, becoming one of the top five highest grossing adult films of all time.   Some of the other films he has appeared in include Expose Me Now, Bodies in Heat, and Rambone Does Hollywood. He created the stage name "Herschel Savage" with adult actor Jamie Gillis in an attempt to combine a 'nerdy Jewish identity' with that of a stud.

During the mid-1980s, Savage helped to organize sex workers in San Francisco to fight for better wages. The initiative was ultimately abandoned after production studios threatened to blacklist performers. In 1986, Savage appeared in a cameo for the neo-noir crime film 52 Pick-Up starring Roy Scheider and Ann-Margret. He was credited as "Harvey Cowen". In 1988, Savage was inducted into the XRCO Hall of Fame. That same year, he left pornography to work in sales and video distribution. He returned to performing in 1997.

Savage appeared as a guest during the fifth season of the NBC sitcom Just Shoot Me, which aired on February 1, 2001. In 2003, he performed a stand-up routine on an episode of the reality television series Family Business. Savage portrayed a detective in the 2008 parody film The Texas Vibrator Massacre. He appeared alongside other adult performers in the documentary series After Porn Ends 3 in 2018. To date, Savage has appeared in more than 1000 adult films. He has also been inducted into the AVN Hall of Fame.

Stage
Savage performed under the name "Max Cohen" in a 2006 production of Neil Simon's The Prisoner of Second Avenue. In January 2013, he portrayed pornographic film director Gerard Damiano in the Los Angeles production of The Deep Throat Sex Scandal, a play described as the "theatrical telling of the back story of 
Deep Throat." His performance drew positive reviews. Writing for The Los Angeles Times, Charlotte Stoudt called Savage's portrayal of Damiano "surprisingly cogent". Myron Meisel from The Hollywood Reporter remarked that he "engenders endearing empathy as the amiably deluded director Damiano." Steven Leigh Morris from LA Weekly deemed his performance "dramatic comedy terra firma". Savage credited the play with "renewing [his] love for performing on stage."

Savage appeared as himself in Pretty Filthy, a musical about the adult film industry. He also performed in the interactive dinner show Joni and Gina's Wedding. In July 2016, Savage premiered Porn Star: My Life In The Sex Industry, an autobiographical one-man show, which he successfully funded through a Kickstarter campaign.

Personal life
Savage is a practicing Buddhist. He resides in California.

Select performances

Film

Television

Theater

Awards

References

External links

 
 
 
 
 The Rialto Report, "Herschel Savage - The Evergreen Porn Star", November 3, 2013 - new audio podcast interview with Herschel Savage

1952 births
Living people
American people of Russian-Jewish descent
American male pornographic film actors
American pornographic film directors
People from Bensonhurst, Brooklyn
Pornographic film actors from New York (state)
AVN Award winners